"Marguerita Time" is a single by the British rock band Status Quo, from their 1983 album Back to Back. The single was also issued in a Christmas double pack that included "Caroline"/"Joanne".

"Nobody but Francis [Rossi] wanted to record it," recalled bassist Alan Lancaster. "All it did was advertise that we were a bunch of nerds."

The song was reprised, in 2014, for the band's thirty-first studio album Aquostic (Stripped Bare). It was featured in the ninety-minute launch performance for the album at London's Roundhouse on 22 October, broadcast live by BBC Radio 2 as part of their In Concert series.

Dexys Midnight Runners covered the song on the B-side of their single "This Is What She's Like". This recording was included on some reissues of the band's Too-Rye-Ay album.

Track listing 
 "Marguerita Time" (Rossi/Frost) (3.27)
 "Resurrection" (Bown/Parfitt) (3.46)

Charts

Certifications

References 

Status Quo (band) songs
1983 singles
Songs written by Francis Rossi
1983 songs
Vertigo Records singles